Archispirostreptus is a genus of giant African millipedes in family Spirostreptidae, containing 26 species:

 Archispirostreptus arabs Pocock, 1876
 Archispirostreptus beccarii Silvestri, 1895
 Archispirostreptus boettegi Silvestri, 1895
 Archispirostreptus camerani Silvestri, 1895
 Archispirostreptus cayennophilus Silvestri, 1897
 Archispirostreptus cechii Silvestri, 1897
 Archispirostreptus compressicauda Silvestri, 1895
 Archispirostreptus conatus Attems, 1928
 Archispirostreptus curiosum Silvestri, 1895
 Archispirostreptus curiosus Silvestri, 1895
 Archispirostreptus divergens Krabbe & Enghoff, 1978
 Archispirostreptus dodsoni Pocock, 1899
 Archispirostreptus gigas Peters, 1855
 Archispirostreptus guayrensis Silvestri, 1896
 Archispirostreptus guineensis Silvestri, 1897
 Archispirostreptus ibanda Silvestri, 1907
 Archispirostreptus lobatus Attems, 1901
 Archispirostreptus lobulatus Attems, 1901
 Archispirostreptus lugubris Brölemann, 1901
 Archispirostreptus phillipsii Pocock, 1896
 Archispirostreptus punctiporus Silvestri, 1897
 Archispirostreptus sanctus Silvestri, 1897
 Archispirostreptus smithii Pocock, 1899
 Archispirostreptus sumptuosus Silvestri, 1896
 Archispirostreptus syriacus DeSaussure, 1859
 Archispirostreptus transmarinus Hoffman, 1965
 Archispirostreptus virgator Silvestri, 1907
 Archispirostreptus xanthoproctus Silvestri, 1897

References

Spirostreptida